Fatma Zouhour Toumi (born 1 May 1971) is a retired Tunisian javelin thrower.

She won the silver medal at the 1995 All-Africa Games and the gold medal at the 1996 African Championships.

References

1971 births
Living people
Tunisian female javelin throwers
African Games silver medalists for Tunisia
Athletes (track and field) at the 1995 All-Africa Games
African Games medalists in athletics (track and field)
20th-century Tunisian women
21st-century Tunisian women